Park Rapids is a city in and the county seat of Hubbard County, Minnesota, United States. It is near Itasca State Park, the source of the Mississippi River, as well as the beginning of the Heartland State Trail. The city was founded in 1890 near the Fish Hook River rapids and is along U.S. Highway 71 and Minnesota State Highway 34. The population was 4,142 at the 2020 census.

History
Park Rapids became a city in 1882, and was named by Frank C. Rice after the park groves and prairies beside the Fish Hook River rapids. These rapids have since been dammed.

Infrastructure

Transportation
Park Rapids and the surrounding Hubbard County area have three major transportation services. South of the city center at 212 W. 2nd Street is Park Rapids Municipal Airport (officially Konshok Field), a general aviation airport. According to the FAA, the airfield is publicly owned by the City of Park Rapids. Also serving the Park Rapids and Hubbard County area for ground transportation is the Hubbard County Heartland Express bus service and a local taxi service. The closest commercial airport is Brainerd Lakes Regional Airport, which is served only by Delta Connection flights to Minneapolis–Saint Paul International Airport, which itself is about 200 miles by car from Park Rapids.

Major highways
U.S. Highway 71 and Minnesota State Highway 34 are two of the main routes through Park Rapids. Highway 34 was expanded in 2008 into a five-lane route through the city. Downtown Main Avenue has street "center parking". Highway 71 and Main Street were reconstructed during the summer of 2009.

Geography
The Fish Hook River flows through the city, which is surrounded by three lakes: Fish Hook, Long, and Potato.

Climate
Park Rapids has a humid continental climate (Köppen Dwb), with warm summers and long, cold snowy winters.

Demographics

2010 census
As of the census of 2010, there were 3,709 people, 1,772 households, and 892 families residing in the city. The racial makeup of the city was 94.1% White, 0.4% African American, 2.3% Native American, 0.1% Asian, 1.2% from other races, and 1.9% from two or more races. Hispanic or Latino of any race were 3.7% of the population.

There were 1,772 households, of which 24.7% had children under the age of 18 living with them, 35.2% were married couples living together, 11.6% had a female householder with no husband present, 3.5% had a male householder with no wife present, and 49.7% were non-families. 44.9% of all households were made up of individuals, and 22.5% had someone living alone who was 65 years of age or older. The average household size was 2.03 and the average family size was 2.80.

The median age in the city was 43.1 years. 22.1% of residents were under the age of 18; 8.4% were between the ages of 18 and 24; 21.7% were from 25 to 44; 22.8% were from 45 to 64; and 24.9% were 65 years of age or older. The gender makeup of the city was 46.3% male and 53.7% female.

2000 census
As of the census of 2000, there were 3,276 people, 1,476 households, and 788 families residing in the city. The racial makeup of the city was 95.97% White, 0.31% African American, 2.20% Native American, 0.37% Asian, 0.03% Pacific Islander, 0.46% from other races, and 0.67% from two or more races. Hispanic or Latino of any race were 1.07% of the population.

There were 1,476 households, out of which 25.3% had children under the age of 18 living with them, 39.2% were married couples living together, 10.8% had a female householder with no husband present, and 46.6% were non-families. 41.8% of all households were made up of individuals, and 23.3% had someone living alone who was 65 years of age or older. The average household size was 2.11 and the average family size was 2.88.

In the city, the population was spread out, with 23.5% under the age of 18, 7.8% from 18 to 24, 21.9% from 25 to 44, 18.8% from 45 to 64, and 28.1% who were 65 years of age or older.  The median age was 42 years. For every 100 females, there were 81.7 males.  For every 100 females age 18 and over, there were 77.3 males.

The median income for a household in the city was $23,628, and the median income for a family was $33,958. Males had a median income of $28,718 versus $21,827 for females. The per capita income for the city was $16,416.  About 11.6% of families and 12.2% of the population were below the poverty line, including 11.3% of those under age 18 and 13.1% of those age 65 or over.

Notable people
Park Rapids is the birthplace of two notable authors, Will Weaver and Nathan Aaseng. Weaver was born to a farming family and educated at Saint Cloud State University, the University of Minnesota, and Stanford University. He worked as a farmer, an educator, and a fiction writer. Three of his best-known novels are Striking Out, Farm Team, and Hard Ball. They reflect Weaver's upbringing on a northern Minnesota farm. His writings have won several awards, including the Friends of American Writers Award (1989) and the Minnesota Book Award for Fiction (1989). Weaver now lives in Bemidji.

Aaseng was the son of a minister and attended Luther College and Luther Seminary. He worked as a microbiologist-biochemist and wrote juvenile nonfiction and fiction. His works include more than 130 books on a variety of subjects. Some examples are Big Red, Wild Trek, and the "You Are the Coach" series.

Minnesota newspaper editor and legislator John A. Ainley, Jr., lived in Park Rapids.

Iowa newspaper editor and legislator Thomas Miller was born in Park Rapids.

Businesswoman and Minnesota state legislator Esther Miriam Fieldman lived in Park Rapids.

Four-time U.S. Paralympian Aaron Pike was born in Park Rapids and spent his first year there before moving away for his father's military career. Pike continued to return to Park Rapids each summer and continues to list it as his hometown. He competes in wheelchair racing and Nordic skiing.

Recreation

There are over 70 lakes in the Park Rapids area, which all offer distinct fishing opportunities. Some notable nearby lakes include Lake Itasca (headwaters of the Mississippi River) as well as some of the numerous Crow Wing Lakes. Some of the most common fish caught in the area include largemouth, smallmouth and rock bass, bullhead, crappie, northern pike, perch, sunfish and walleye. The Heartland Trail, one of the oldest rail-to-trail projects in the United States, begins in Park Rapids. The 49-mile trail is open to horseback riding, hiking, snowmobiling, and biking at different segments throughout. Deer, coyote, grey wolf, chipmunks, bobcat, bear, bald eagle, red fox, raccoon, beaver and muskrat can all be spotted along the trail.

Local media
Park Rapids is home to De La Hunt Broadcasting, east of the city's downtown. There are three radio stations in Park Rapids:

KPRM AM 870 (Talk and Classic Country)
KXKK FM 92.5 (Country music)
KDKK FM 97.5 (Adult Standards)

Park Rapids receives five television stations:

 KAWE Ch. 9 PBS (Bemidji)
 KVLY-TV Ch. 11 NBC (Fargo)
 KCCW Ch. 12 CBS (Walker)
 KVRR Ch. 15 FOX (Fargo)
 KSAX Ch. 42 ABC (Alexandria)

The local cable TV provider is Arvig Communication Systems.

Newspaper
The Forum Communications Company of Fargo, North Dakota, owns and operates the Park Rapids Enterprise, published twice weekly.

Education
Park Rapids Area High School, at 401 Huntsinger Avenue, serves grades 9–12. Century School, at 501 Helten Avenue, houses grades K–8.

Park Rapids had two separate buildings for primary school that split up K–4 and 9–12 from grades 5–8. Frank White Elementary and Park Rapids High School were part of the same building. The Century School was built in 2001 to accommodate grades K–8. The Frank White Elementary School was remodeled and pieces of it became part of the Park Rapids Area High School, while several of the Frank White classrooms became preschool classrooms. The old Park Rapids Middle School was sold several times and part of it is now apartments.

References

External links

 Park Rapids Chamber
 Area Lodging Association 
 Park Rapids Government
 De La Hunt Broadcasting
 Park Rapids Enterprise
 Park Rapids Area School District 309
 Park Avenue School of Cosmetology
 Park Rapids Webcam 
 State Bank of Park Rapids

Cities in Hubbard County, Minnesota
Cities in Minnesota
Populated places established in 1890
County seats in Minnesota
1890 establishments in Minnesota